James Quinn (23 November 1947 – 29 April 2002) was a Scottish footballer, who played for Celtic, Clyde and Sheffield Wednesday. At Celtic, he was considered to be a member of the group known as the Quality Street Gang which included future international stars Davie Hay, Kenny Dalglish, Lou Macari and Danny McGrain.

Quinn was the grandson of former Celtic and Scotland player, also named Jimmy Quinn.

References

External links 
Jimmy Quinn

1947 births
2002 deaths
Footballers from North Lanarkshire
People from Kilsyth
Association football fullbacks
Scottish footballers
Celtic F.C. players
Clyde F.C. players
Maryhill Harp F.C. players
Scottish Junior Football Association players
Sheffield Wednesday F.C. players
Scottish Football League players
English Football League players
People from Croy